Crelan was introduced as the bank brand after the merger of Landbouwkrediet / Crédit Agricole and Centea. It is a Belgian bank with roots in agriculture.  It is part of Crelan Group, which was 50 percent owned by the Crédit Agricole Group.  At the time, KBC and BNP Paribas were the other main shareholders. The arrival of a new bank brand will strengthen the group, in particular the group's online banking and the "Customer Protection" area. Through this acquisition, the new group intends to address the segment of the Belgian population that currently uses unbranded, incomplete financial services. In June 2015 Crelan became again a 100% Belgian cooperative bank, owned by its clients. In 2018 Crelan Group had 919,887 customers and +/- 600 branches, and made a net profit of €66 million.

History
Its retail banking and commercial enterprises have grown to equal its agricultural interests. In 2006, the bank reported a growth rate of 49%, according to International Financial Reporting Standards (IFRS) with a net result of €52 million. In recent years it acquired  and Keytrade Bank (sold in 2016 to CM ARKEA). Landbouwkrediet was officially recognized as a bank insurance company in 2007, further strengthening its market position.

In 2019, Crelan announced its intention to acquire AXA Bank Belgium, the Belgian banking business of French insurer AXA, for 620 million euros ($688.51 million). The acquisition, which closed in December 2021 makes Crelan Belgium's fifth-largest lender.

Sponsoring
Since 2001 the bank has sponsored several professional cycling teams, which hosted two world champions, Sven Nys, Wout van Aert and Sanne Cant.

References

External links

Banks of Belgium